This is a list of the National Register of Historic Places listings in Gregg County, Texas.

This is intended to be a complete list of properties and districts listed on the National Register of Historic Places in Gregg County, Texas. There are one district and five individual properties listed on the National Register in the county. All individually listed properties are also Recorded Texas Historic Landmarks.

Current listings

The locations of National Register properties and districts may be seen in a mapping service provided.

|}

See also

National Register of Historic Places listings in Texas
Recorded Texas Historic Landmarks in Gregg County

References

External links

Gregg County, Texas
Gregg County
Buildings and structures in Gregg County, Texas